Crimean leaflet — newspaper of public life; literary and political newspaper published in Simferopol in 1878-1879. The newspaper was published twice a week. The newspaper was closed in April 1879. The reason for the appearance of the newspaper was the Russo-Turkish war of 1877—1878, which caused an increase in the need for information in society, which caused the trend of new publications, in most cases private.

Editors and publishers 

 N. V. Mikhno

References 

Russian-language newspapers
Newspapers published in Ukraine
Defunct newspapers published in Ukraine